This is a list of marshals and full generals and admirals of the People's Republic of China, including all branches of the People's Liberation Army and the People's Armed Police.

Marshals 

Ten PLA officers were awarded the rank of Marshal (yuan shuai) in 1955. The rank was never awarded again.
 Zhu De
 Peng Dehuai
 Lin Biao
 Liu Bocheng
 He Long
 Chen Yi
 Luo Ronghuan
 Xu Xiangqian
 Nie Rongzhen
 Ye Jianying

Army Generals 

Ten PLA officers were awarded the rank of Army General/Fleet Admiral (da jiang) in 1955. The rank was never awarded again.
 Su Yu
 Xu Haidong
 Huang Kecheng
 Chen Geng
 Tan Zheng
 Xiao Jinguang
 Zhang Yunyi
 Luo Ruiqing
 Wang Shusheng
 Xu Guangda

Senior generals (shang Jiang, 1955) 
 Zhang Chi
 Song Renqiong
 Zhao Erlu
 Xiao Ke
 Wang Zhen
 Zhou Chunquan
 Xu Shiyou
 Liu Yalou
 Deng Hua
 Chen Zaidao
 Yang Dezhi
 Peng Shaohui
 Wang Hongkun
 Li Kenong
 Chen Bojun
 Li Da
 Yang Chengwu
 Li Tao
 Xiao Hua
 Gan Siqi
 Lai Chuanzhu
 Chen Qihan
 Song Shilun
 Su Zhenhua
 Chen Xilian
 Chen Shiju
 Wang Xinting
 Xie Fuzhi
 Ye Fei
 Huang Yongsheng
 Zhu Liangcai
 Yang Yong
 Zhang Aiping
 Fu Qiutao
 Han Xianchu
 Tang Liang
 Hong Xuezhi
 Li Zhimin
 Zhou Huan
 Li Tianyou
 Liu Zhen
 Yang Zhicheng
 Wang Ping
 Zhong Qiguang
 Guo Tianmin
 Wei Guoqing
 He Bingyan
 Lu Zhengcao
 Ulanhu
 Fu Zhong
 Zhou Shidi
 Tao Zhiyue
 Dong Qiwu
 Chen Mingren
 Yan Hongyan
 Wang Jian'an (1956)
 Li Jukui (1958)

Generals (14 September 1988) 
Since 1988, the People's Liberation Army rank of shang jiang (上将: literally, "senior general") is translated as General.
 Hong Xuezhi (2nd time)
 Liu Huaqing
 Qin Jiwei
 Chi Haotian
 Yang Baibing
 Zhao Nanqi
 Xu Xin
 Guo Linxiang
 You Taizhong
 Wang Chenghan
 Zhang Zhen
 Li Desheng
 Liu Zhenhua
 Xiang Shouzhi
 Wan Haifeng
 Li Yaowen
 Wang Hai

Generals (7 June 1993) 
 Zhang Wannian
 Yu Yongbo
 Fu Quanyou
 Zhu Dunfa
 Zhang Lianzhong
 Cao Shuangming

Generals (8 June 1994) 
 Xu Huizi
 Li Jing
 Yang Dezhong
 Wang Ruilin
 Zhou Keyu
 Ding Henggao
 Dai Xuejiang
 Lin Boang
 Gu Shanqing
 Liu Jingsong
 Cao Fansheng
 Zhang Taiheng
 Song Qingwei
 Gu Hui
 Li Xilin
 Shi Yuxiao

Generals (23 January 1996) 
 Zhou Ziyu
 Yu Zhenwu
 Ding Wenchang
 Sui Yongju

Generals (27 March 1998) 
 Cao Gangchuan
 Yang Guoliang
 Zhang Gong
 Xing Shizhong
 Wang Maorun
 Fang Zuqi
 Tao Bojun
 Zhang Zhijian
 Yang Guoping

Generals (29 September 1999) 
 Guo Boxiong
 Xu Caihou

Generals (21 June 2000) 
 Huai Fulin
 Wu Quanxu
 Qian Shugen
 Xiong Guangkai
 Tang Tianbiao
 Yuan Shoufang
 Zhang Shutian
 Zhou Kunren
 Li Jinai
 Shi Yunsheng
 Yang Huaiqing
 Liu Shunyao
 Wang Zuxun
 Du Tiehuan
 Liao Xilong
 Xu Yongqing

Generals (2 June 2002) 
 Qiao Qingchen
 Wen Zongren
 Qian Guoliang
 Jiang Futang
 Chen Bingde
 Liang Guanglie
 Liu Shutian

Generals (20 June 2004) 
 Ge Zhenfeng
 Zhang Li
 You Xigui
 Zhang Wentai
 Hu Yanlin
 Zheng Shenxia
 Zhao Keming
 Zhu Qi
 Liu Dongdong
 Lei Mingqiu
 Liu Zhenwu
 Yang Deqing
 Wu Shuangzhan
 Sui Mingtai

Generals (25 September 2004) 
 Zhang Dingfa
 Jing Zhiyuan

Generals (24 June 2006) 
 Liu Yongzhi
 Sun Zhongtong
 Chi Wanchun
 Deng Changyou
 Peng Xiaofeng
 Pei Huailiang
 Fu Tinggui
 Yu Linxiang
 Zhu Wenquan
 Wang Jianmin

Generals (6 July 2007) 
 Xu Qiliang
 Sun Dafa
 Wu Shengli

Generals (2 November 2007) 
 Chang Wanquan

Generals (15 July 2008) 
 Liu Zhenqi
 Huang Xianzhong
 Fan Changlong

Generals (20 July 2009) 
 Ma Xiaotian
 Liu Yuan
 Zhang Haiyang

Generals (19 July 2010) 
 Zhang Qinsheng
 Tong Shiping
 Liu Chengjun
 Wang Xibin
 Fang Fenghui
 Wang Guosheng
 Zhao Keshi
 Chen Guoling
 Zhang Yang
 Li Shiming

Generals (23 July 2011) 
 Sun Jianguo
 Hou Shusen
 Jia Ting'an
 Liu Xiaojiang
 Zhang Youxia

Generals (30 July 2012) 
 Du Jincai
 Liu Yazhou
 Du Hengyan
 Tian Xiusi
 Wang Jianping
 Xu Yaoyuan

Generals (23 November 2012) 
 Wei Fenghe

Promoted in 2013 
On 31 July 2013, 6 officers were promoted to general:
 Wu Changde
 Wang Hongyao
 Sun Sijing
 Liu Fulian
 Cai Yingting
 Xu Fenlin

Promoted in 2014 
On 11 July 2014, 4 officers were promoted to general:
 Qi Jianguo
 Wang Jiaocheng
 Chu Yimin
 Wei Liang

Promoted in 2015 
On 31 July 2015, 10 officers were promoted to general:
 Wang Guanzhong
 Yin Fanglong
 Miao Hua
 Zhang Shibo
 Song Puxuan
 Liu Yuejun
 Zhao Zongqi
 Zheng Weiping
 Li Zuocheng
 Wang Ning

Promoted in 2016 
On 29 July 2016, 2 officers were promoted to general:
 Zhu Fuxi
 Yi Xiaoguang

Promoted in 2017 
On 28 July 2017, 5 officers were promoted to general:
 Han Weiguo
 Liu Lei
 Yu Zhongfu
 Wang Jiasheng
 Gao Jin

On 2 November 2017, one officer was promoted to general:
 Zhang Shengmin

Promoted in 2019 
On 31 July 2019, 10 officers were promoted to general:
 Li Shangfu
 Yuan Yubai
 Wu Shezhou
 Fan Xiaojun
 Zhu Shengling
 Shen Jinlong
 Qin Shengxiang
 Ding Laihang
 Zheng He
 An Zhaoqing

On 12 December 2019, 7 officers were promoted to general:
 He Weidong
 He Ping
 Wang Jianwu
 Li Qiaoming
 Zhou Yaning
 Li Fengbiao
 Yang Xuejun

Promoted in 2020 
On 29 July 2020, one officer was promoted to general:
 Xu Zhongbo

On 18 December 2020, 4 officers were promoted to general:
 Guo Puxiao
 Zhang Xudong
 Li Wei
 Wang Chunning

Promoted in 2021 
On 5 July 2021, 4 officers were promoted to general:
 Wang Xiubin
 Xu Qiling
 Liu Zhenli
 Ju Qiansheng

On 6 September 2021, 5 officers were promoted to general:
 Wang Haijiang
 Lin Xiangyang
 Dong Jun
 Chang Dingqiu
 Xu Xueqiang

Promoted in 2022 
On 21 January 2022, 7 officers were promoted to general:
 Liu Qingsong
 Wu Ya'nan
 Xu Deqing
 Qin Shutong
 Yuan Huazhi
 Li Yuchao
 Zhang Hongbing

On 8 September 2022, 1 officer were promoted to general:

 Wang Qiang

References 

PLA
People's Republic of China
China